Slowly Going the Way of the Buffalo is the fourth studio album released by American punk rock band MxPx in 1998. The album title was taken from a letter that a fan had written to the band, complaining that the band was changing and was "slowly going the way of the buffalo".

Background
Due to the success of MxPx's "Chick Magnet", from their previous album, Life in General, the band signed a multi-album contract with A&M. A&M had previously signed a deal with Tooth & Nail to co-market Life in General. This market deal was "cobbled together in order to sign the band", according to A&M chairman Al Cafaro.

Composition and recording
Moving away from the sound of Life in General, the band "dirtied things up a little", according to vocalist and bassist Mike Herrera, for Slowly Going the Way of the Buffalo. The band refrained from making the album "sound like it was produced in a lab." Greg Hetson of Bad Religion has guest vocals on "The Downfall of Western Civilization".

Release
To generate hype, A&M picked 1,000 of the band's fans and, from April to June 1998, sent them a CD of songs from the album. Despite the band's sizable fan base, the label was not approaching the album with high expectations. The vice president of A&M estimated the album would easily achieve 100,000 in sales. On May 6, "I'm OK, You're OK" was sent to modern rock radio stations. The band supported Bad Religion on their tour of Europe in May. Slowly Going the Way of the Buffalo was released on June 16 through A&M. From June 30, for five weeks, the band played on the 1998 edition of Warped Tour. In August, the band supported Blink-182.

Reception

The album charted at number 99 on the Billboard 200 and at number 2 on the Top Contemporary Christian chart. It certified gold in January 2000 by the Recording Industry Association of America.

Track listing

Personnel

MxPx
Mike Herrera — bass, vocals
Tom Wisniewski — guitar, backing vocals
Yuri Ruley — drums

Additional musicians
Ronnie King — keyboard
Greg Hetson — lead guitar on "The Downfall of the Western Civilization"
Dale Yob — vocals on "I'm Ok, You're OK"
Jeff Bettger — screams on "Fist vs. Tact" and "The Theme Fiasco"

Production
Steve Kravac — producer, mixing
Aaron Warner — production assistant
Al Lay — mixing assistant
Brian "Big Bass" Gardner — mastering

Artwork
Marina Chavez — photography
Mitch Tobias — photography
John Nissen — illustrations
Luke W. Midkiff — illustrations/ video direction

Chart positions

Album

Certifications

References

Bibliography

 
 
 

1998 albums
MxPx albums
A&M Records albums
Albums recorded at Robert Lang Studios